Favio Cabral (born 5 February 2001) is an Argentine professional footballer who plays as a forward for Primera Nacional side Douglas Haig, on loan from Talleres.

Professional career
In May 2019, Cabral signed his first professional contract with Talleres . Cabral made his professional debut for Talleres in a 4-1 Argentine Primera División loss to Defensa y Justicia on 26 January 2020.

In April 2021, he was loaned to Chilean Primera División side Curicó Unido with an option to buy. After returning, he was sent out on a new loan spell in January 2022, this time to Primera Nacional side Club Almagro until the end of the year. However, the spell at Almagro was terminated before time, and Cabral instead joined Douglas Haig in June 2022 on loan until the end of the year.

References

External links
 
 

2001 births
Living people
Argentine footballers
Argentine expatriate footballers
People from Avellaneda Partido
Association football forwards
Sportspeople from Buenos Aires Province
Talleres de Córdoba footballers
Curicó Unido footballers
Club Almagro players
Club Atlético Douglas Haig players
Argentine Primera División players
Primera Nacional players
Chilean Primera División players
Argentine expatriate sportspeople in Chile
Expatriate footballers in Chile